Piret Pormeister (born 16 May 1985) is an Estonian cross-country skier. She competed in three events at the 2006 Winter Olympics.

Cross-country skiing results
All results are sourced from the International Ski Federation (FIS).

Olympic Games

World Championships

World Cup

Season standings

References

External links
 

1985 births
Living people
Estonian female cross-country skiers
Olympic cross-country skiers of Estonia
Cross-country skiers at the 2006 Winter Olympics
Sportspeople from Tallinn